I Can't... I Can't, released worldwide as Wedding Night, is a 1970 film. It was the directorial debut of Piers Haggard.

Plot
Following the recent death of her mother in childbirth, a newly married Irish Catholic girl becomes unstable due to fears of marital sex and pregnancy, and refuses to consummate her marriage.

Cast
Dennis Waterman - Joe O'Reilly 
Tessa Wyatt - Mady O'Reilly 
Alexandra Bastedo - Gloria 
Eddie Byrne - Tom 
Martin Dempsey - Father Keegan 
Marie O'Donnell - Kate 
Patrick Laffan - Dr. Farnum

Reception
The film was a commercial failure but led to Haggard's hiring as director on The Blood on Satan's Claw.

References

External links

1970 films
British drama films
Irish drama films
Films directed by Piers Haggard
1970 directorial debut films
English-language Irish films
1970s English-language films
1970s British films